The Adventures of Nero Wolfe is a 1943–44 American radio drama series produced by Himan Brown and featuring Rex Stout's fictional detective. Three actors portrayed Nero Wolfe over the course of the series. J. B. Williams starred in its first incarnation, beginning April 10, 1943, on the regional New England Network. Santos Ortega assumed the role when the suspense drama moved to ABC on July 5, 1943, and continued as Wolfe until sometime in 1944 when he was succeeded by Luis Van Rooten. Archie Goodwin, Wolfe's assistant and legman, was played by Joseph Julian. Based on Stout's principal characters but not his stories, the series ended with the broadcast July 14, 1944.

Production
Producer Himan Brown persuaded Rex Stout to agree to a Nero Wolfe radio series, for which the author received a weekly royalty for the use of his characters. Louis Vittes wrote most of the scripts for the 30-minute episodes, basing none of them on Stout's original stories.

The Adventures of Nero Wolfe began on the regional New England Network April 10–June 25, 1943, with J. B. Williams starring as Rex Stout's armchair detective, Nero Wolfe. After a three-month trial run the show moved to the Blue Network, which soon became ABC. Santos Ortega starred in the weekly suspense drama, which aired July 5–September 27, 1943. Wolfe's assistant, Archie Goodwin, was played by John Gibson and Joseph Julian.

Following a four-month hiatus for the network's winter programming, The Adventures of Nero Wolfe resumed January 21, 1944, with Ortega and Julian continuing as Wolfe and Archie. Ortega was succeeded sometime during that year by Luis van Rooten.

Although the show was a success, disagreements between Brown and Stout's representative, Edwin Fadiman, led to the series ending after the broadcast July 14, 1944.

Episodes

New England Network
No episodes of the New England Network trial run of The Adventures of Nero Wolfe are in circulation. Twelve episodes aired weekly April 10–June 26, 1943. No titles are available.

Blue Network – ABC
Only one episode of the Blue Network – ABC run of The Adventures of Nero Wolfe is in circulation, an episode that was chosen for rebroadcast by the Armed Forces Radio Service's Mystery Playhouse series. The announcer for "The Last Laugh Murder Case" (July 14, 1944) was Peter Lorre.

See also 
The Amazing Nero Wolfe, a 1945 Mutual radio series starring Francis X. Bushman
The New Adventures of Nero Wolfe, a 1950–51 NBC radio series starring Sydney Greenstreet
 Nero Wolfe (1982 radio series), a 1982 Canadian Broadcasting Corporation radio series starring Mavor Moore

References

American radio dramas
Detective radio shows
1940s American radio programs
1943 radio programme debuts
1944 radio programme endings
Radio programmes based on novels
Nero Wolfe
ABC radio programs